San Marino is a small European republic, with limited public transport facilities. It is an enclave in central Italy. The principal public transport links involve buses, helicopters, and an aerial tramway. There was a public electric railway network, a small part of which has been preserved and returned to service in 2012 as a tourist attraction.

Railway

There is a disused railway to Rimini, with much of the infrastructure such as tunnels still intact. An 800-metre section from just  outside the San Marino terminal station was put into service in 2012 as a tourist attraction.

Aerial tramway

There is a 300 m aerial tramway connecting the city of San Marino on top of Monte Titano with Borgo Maggiore, a major town in the republic, with the second largest population of any Sammarinese settlement. Indeed, for the tourist visitor the aerial tramway gives the best available views of Borgo Maggiore, as the cars sweep low over the rooftops of the main town square. From here a further connection is available to the nation's largest settlement, Dogana, by means of local bus service.

Two aerial tramway cars, known as gondolas, and numbered '1' and '2', operate in opposition on a cable, and a service is provided at roughly fifteen-minute intervals throughout the day. A third vehicle is available on the system, being a service car for the use of engineers maintaining the tramway.

The upper station of the aerial tramway serves no other purpose (although it is situated close to a tourist information office). However, the lower station in Borgo Maggiore has a number of retail and catering outlets situated within its overall structure.

Taxi and private road vehicles

There are 220 km of highways in the country, the main road being the San Marino Highway. Roads are well used by private car drivers. Sammarinese authorities license private vehicles with distinctive licence plates which are white with blue figures, usually a letter followed by up to four numbers. To the left of these figures is printed the national Coat of Arms of San Marino. Many vehicles also carry the international vehicle identification code (in black on a white oval sticker), which is "RSM". Since 2004 custom licence plates have also become available.

A limited licensed taxi service operates nationwide. There are seven licensed taxi operating companies in the republic, and Italian taxis regularly operate within San Marino when carrying passengers picked up in Italian territory.

Buses

There is a regular international bus service between Rimini and the city of San Marino, popular with both tourists and tourist industry workers commuting to San Marino from Italy. This service stops at approximately twenty advertised locations in Rimini and within San Marino, with its two terminus stops at Rimini railway station and San Marino coach station, respectively.

San Marino also has its own local bus system within the republic, which provides a limited service connecting the capital and the smaller rural communities across eight routes. Cross-border connection to Rimini public transport buses is available across highway bridge in Rovereta, at the Bivio Rovereta stop, served by route 7 of START Romagna. Route 16 serves the nearby Strada Statale Consolare and Via Marignano, in proximity of Dogana. . 

The local bus service is operated by the Azienda Autonoma dei Servizi di Stato, which also takes care of the aerial tramway and the national electricity, water, gas, and environmental services. Its routes are:

1 Città-Murata-Fiorentino-Chiesanuova-Confine
2 Città-Murata-Borgo Maggiore-Ventoso-Gualdicciolo-Molarini
3s Città-Borgo Maggiore-San Giovanni-Fiorentino-Cerbaiola-Montegiardino-Calligheria-Cà Chiavello-Fiumicello-Faetano-Borgo Maggiore-Città
3d Città-Borgo Maggiore-Faetano-Calligheria-Cà Chiavello-Fiumicello-Caligheria-Montegiardino-Cerbaiola-Fiorentino-San Giovanni-Borgo Maggiore-Città
4 Città-Murata-Borgo Maggiore-Domagnano-Serravalle-Dogana-Falciano-Rovereta
5 Borgo Maggiore-Città-Carrare-Casole-Montalbo-Cà Berlone
6 Città-Murata-Montalbo-Borgo Maggiore-Valdragone-Domagnano-Ospedale-Dogana Piazza
7 Città-Murata-Borgo Maggiore-Cailungo-Serravalle-Dogana-Galazzano]
8 Ospedale-Dogana-Falciano-Dogana-Serravalle-Ospedale

Air transport

There is a small airfield called Torraccia airfield located in Domagnano right next to the border. There is also an international heliport located in Borgo Maggiore. Most tourists who arrive by air land at Rimini's Federico Fellini Airport, Italy, and then make the transfer by bus.

Waterways

Two rivers flow through San Marino, but there is no major water transport, and no major port or harbour.

References

External links